Rich Love, Poor Love is a collaboration album by singers Syreeta and G.C. Cameron, released by Motown in 1977.

Track listing

Personnel
Syreeta – vocals
G.C. Cameron – vocals
David T. Walker, Greg Poree, Jay Graydon – guitar
David Shields, Henry Davis – bass guitar
Michael Lovesmith, Sonny Burke – keyboards
James Gadson, Ollie E. Brown – drums
Gary Coleman, Jack Ashford, Julius Wechter – percussion
William Green – saxophone on "You Need a Change"
Danny Smith, Marti McCall, Michael Lovesmith, Myrna Matthews, Pattie Brooks, Petsye Powell - backing vocals

1977 albums
Syreeta albums
Motown albums